The Renaissance Reno (formerly Holiday Reno and Siena Reno) is a hotel and former casino in Reno, Nevada. It opened in 1956 as the Holiday, closed in 1998, and reopened as Siena in 2001. It uses the Renaissance Hotels brand under license from Marriott International.

History

Holiday (1956–1998)
Holiday opened in 1956 as a non-gaming hotel. Within a year of its opening, poor performance resulted in the addition of gaming. At the end of October 1998, after 42 years in business, Holiday closed.
Shortly after the old Holiday closed, it was purchased by California investor Barney Ng, who planned to remodel the old building by completely gutting the structure and then rebuilding and expanding on it, at a cost of US$16-$20 million, transforming the structure and adding an all suite floor, an additional wing to the tower, a larger casino, dining venues, a large spa, and an entrance with a clock tower.

Siena (2001–2017)
The hotel opened on July 31, 2001 with 500 employees.

After years of financial struggle, Siena was closed on October 21, 2010.

It was decided by creditors to auction the hotel off and that was done on November 10, 2010. A group of investors from various locations around the country including Reno with hospitality experience called "Grand Siena, LLC" purchased the property for $3.9 million.

Grand Siena, LLC invested $5 million into refurbishing Siena Reno, including remodeled rooms, a redesigned casino, new restaurants and entertainment venues and a revamped spa. They claimed the hotel was positioned to rank as a 4 or 5 diamond resort. The newly revamped Siena opened on April 18, 2011.

The new owners of the boutique resort say they have replaced much of the old Italian theme with an aggressive-contemporary theme using much marble, LED lighting, and imported artwork. They say the new facility will cater to a more mature audience with less emphasis on loud nightlife.

In May 2015, Grand Siena, LLC agreed to sell the Siena. The casino closed on June 30, 2015, the day before the sale was completed. Months later, the ownership group, led by developer Fernando Leal, announced that the Siena would be rebranded as a Renaissance Hotel, and confirmed that the casino would not reopen.

Renaissance by Marriott (2017–present)
In 2017, renovations were completed and the rebranding as a Renaissance Hotel took effect.

References

External links

 

1956 establishments in Nevada
Casino hotels
Casinos completed in 1956
Casinos in Reno, Nevada
Defunct casinos in Nevada
Hotel buildings completed in 1956
Hotels established in 1956
Hotels in Reno, Nevada